Derek Cha is the founder of Sweet Frog, an American frozen yogurt chain, which originated in Richmond, Virginia in 2009.

Early life and Career
Derek Cha was born and raised in the Republic of South Korea.  At the age of 12, Cha migrated to the United States.  In 1985, Cha started two framing businesses named "Art and Frame Depot" and "Art and Frame Warehouse."  He eventually grew the businesses into a large chain of 80 stores nationwide generating between $5 to $10 million a year in revenues, but as the housing market declined in 2006 and the US economy went into recession, Cha found his stores struggling. In the year 2009, there weren't many of the initial 80 stores that remained open, and not many were operating profitably. Six months later, Cha opted for a completely new venture - frozen yogurt.

Founding of Sweet Frog 
In 2009, Cha and his wife opened the first Sweet Frog in Short Pump, Virginia. It was their first self-service frozen yogurt shop. Several months later, on July 7, they opened their second store, in Chesterfield, Virginia, which was even more successful than the first store. Their next stores were then opened in Chesterfield, Richmond, Charlottesville, Lynchburg, and Williamsburg, all located in Virginia.  The growth continued in 2011, as Sweet Frog opened 29 stores, and accelerated in 2012 as 113 more Sweet Frog stores opened, mostly located in the east coast states of Virginia, North Carolina, Maryland, South Carolina, and Pennsylvania. On April 17, 2012, at a time when Sweet Frog had 180 stores operating in the United States and a few foreign countries, Boxwood Capital Partners bought into Derek Cha's vision of growth and made a minority investment into Sweet Frog Enterprises, LLC, the company that owns and operates Sweet Frog.

References

Haas School of Business alumni
American people of Korean descent
American food industry businesspeople
Fast-food chain founders
Living people
Year of birth missing (living people)
Businesspeople from Richmond, Virginia